Șuncuiuș is a commune in Bihor County, Crișana, Romania. It has a population of 3,259 people and is composed of four villages: Bălnaca (Körösbánlaka), Bălnaca-Groși (Körösbánlakai erdő), Șuncuiuș and Zece Hotare (Révtízfalu).

At the 2011 census, of the inhabitants for whom data were available, 89.8% of inhabitants were Romanians, 7.9% Roma and 2.1% Hungarians. Using the same parameters, the census counted 78.9% of inhabitants as Romanian Orthodox, 15.3% as Pentecostals, 3.2% as Baptists and 1.5% as Reformed.

The commune features a clay mine operated by the Timișoara-based Bega Grup.

References

Communes in Bihor County
Localities in Crișana